"Get Over It" is a song by Guillemots, which appears on the band's second album, Red. It was released as the first single from their second album on 17 March 2008.

The music has a disco-influenced pop sound.

The song was championed by BBC Radio 1 presenter Scott Mills and featured on the station's playlist. The debut chart position for the single was #20 on the official UK singles chart for the week ending 23 March 2008.

The video was filmed in 2008, and was directed by Guillemots member MC Lord Magrão.

Tracks
CD
"Get Over It" (album version)
"Throw Me a Sun"
"Me Diz"

7" #1
"Get Over It" (album version)
"What We Have"

7" #2
"Get Over It" (album version)
"This Is the Last Ride Tonight"

iTunes single
"Get Over It" (radio edit)

iTunes EP 1
"Get Over It" (album version)
"Me Diz"
"This Is the Last Ride Tonight"

iTunes EP 2
"Get Over It" (album version)
"Throw Me A Sun"
"What We Have"

Notes

2007 singles
Guillemots (band) songs
2007 songs